In mathematical logic, independence is the unprovability of a sentence from other sentences.
 
A sentence σ is independent of a given first-order theory T if T neither proves nor refutes σ; that is, it is impossible to prove σ from T, and it is also impossible to prove from T that σ is false. Sometimes, σ is said (synonymously) to be undecidable from T; this is not the same meaning of "decidability" as in a decision problem.

A theory T is independent if each axiom in T is not provable from the remaining axioms in T. A theory for which there is an independent set of axioms is independently axiomatizable.

Usage note
Some authors say that σ is independent of T when T simply cannot prove σ, and do not necessarily assert by this that T cannot refute σ. These authors will sometimes say "σ is independent of and consistent with T" to indicate that T can neither prove nor refute σ.

Independence results in set theory

Many interesting statements in set theory are independent of Zermelo–Fraenkel set theory (ZF). The following statements in set theory are known to be independent of ZF, under the assumption that ZF is consistent:
The axiom of choice
The continuum hypothesis and the generalized continuum hypothesis
The Suslin conjecture

The following statements (none of which have been proved false) cannot be proved in ZFC (the Zermelo-Fraenkel set theory plus the axiom of choice) to be independent of ZFC, under the added hypothesis that ZFC is consistent. 

The existence of strongly inaccessible cardinals
The existence of large cardinals
The non-existence of Kurepa trees

The following statements are inconsistent with the axiom of choice, and therefore with ZFC. However they are probably independent of ZF, in a corresponding sense to the above: They cannot be proved in ZF, and few working set theorists expect to find a refutation in ZF. However ZF cannot prove that they are independent of ZF, even with the added hypothesis that ZF is consistent.

The axiom of determinacy
The axiom of real determinacy
AD+

Applications to physical theory 
Since 2000, logical independence has become understood as having crucial significance in the foundations of physics.

See also
List of statements independent of ZFC
Parallel postulate for an example in geometry

Notes

References 
 
 
 

Mathematical logic
Proof theory